Comes Love" is a 1939 jazz standard. It was composed by Sam H. Stept, with lyrics by Lew Brown and Charles Tobias. It was featured in the Broadway musical Yokel Boy, starring Phil Silvers and Buddy Ebsen, where it was introduced by Judy Canova.

Notable recordings 

 The Andrews Sisters
 Roxanne Beck
 Suzy Bogguss
 Rossana Casale
 Peter Cincotti
 Rosemary Clooney
 Sam Cooke
 Sammy Davis Jr.
 Sinne Eeg
 Connie Evingson
 Ella Fitzgerald
 Helen Forrest
 Gordon Goodwin's Big Phat Band
 Loston Harris
 Billie Holiday
 The Hot Sardines
 Harry James
 Rickie Lee Jones
 Stacey Kent
 Irene Kral
 Diana Krall
 Dorothy Lamour
 Claire Martin
 Carmen McRae
 Joni Mitchell
 Helen O'Connell
 Chloe Perrier
 Janet Seidel
 Artie Shaw
 Kate Smith
 John Stowell
 Sarah Vaughan
 Nikki Yanofsky

Other appearances
 In the Castle episode "The Blue Butterfly", this song is performed by actress Tamala Jones, playing the character of Betsy Sinclair, in a 1940s setting.
 In The Sopranos’ season six premier, "Members Only,” “Comes Love” plays on Uncle Junior’s record player as he shoots Tony in the stomach.

See also
List of jazz standards

References

1930s jazz standards
1939 songs
Songs with lyrics by Lew Brown
Songs with music by Sam H. Stept
Songs written by Charles Tobias